Rigoberto Pérez Amavisca (born 26 November 1912, date of death unknown) was a Mexican pole vaulter who competed in the 1936 Summer Olympics. His personal best in pole vaulting is 4.10 m set in 1939.

References

External links
 

1912 births
Year of death missing
Mexican male pole vaulters
Olympic athletes of Mexico
Athletes (track and field) at the 1936 Summer Olympics
Central American and Caribbean Games gold medalists for Mexico
Competitors at the 1938 Central American and Caribbean Games
Central American and Caribbean Games medalists in athletics
Sportspeople from Hermosillo
20th-century Mexican people